Methanesulfonate monooxygenase (mesylate monooxygenase, mesylate,reduced-FMN:oxygen oxidoreductase, MsmABCD, methanesulfonic acid monooxygenase, MSA monooxygenase, MSAMO) is an enzyme with systematic name methanesulfonate,NADH:oxygen oxidoreductase. This enzyme catalyses the following chemical reaction

 methanesulfonate + NADH + H+ + O2  formaldehyde + NAD+ + sulfite + H2O

Methanesulfonate monooxygenase is a flavoprotein.

References

External links 
 

EC 1.14.13